(born August 13, 1965 in Obira, Hokkaido, Japan) is a Japanese Nordic combined skier who competed during the late 1980s and early 1990s. He won the 3 x 10 km team event at the 1994 Winter Olympics in Lillehammer. Abe also won three medals in the team event at the FIS Nordic World Ski Championships with golds in 1993 (3 x 10 km) and 1995 (4 x 5 km), and a bronze in 1991 (3 x 10 km).

References

External links 
 
 

1965 births
Japanese male Nordic combined skiers
Olympic Nordic combined skiers of Japan
Nordic combined skiers at the 1988 Winter Olympics
Nordic combined skiers at the 1992 Winter Olympics
Nordic combined skiers at the 1994 Winter Olympics
Living people
Olympic medalists in Nordic combined
FIS Nordic World Ski Championships medalists in Nordic combined
Medalists at the 1994 Winter Olympics
Olympic gold medalists for Japan